Elijah Shaw is an American bodyguard, and owner of a security agency. Shaw's clientele has included Usher Raymond, Naomi Campbell, Chaka Khan, and Chris Rock.

Shaw has often been seen in the company of his long-time client Usher Raymond appearing as himself in the singer's Confessions music video and being omnipresent in his documentary and public appearances.  

In 2003 Shaw was contracted to handle the security services of rap star 50 Cent who had recently re-launched his career after being shot 9 times by unknown assailants

In 2006 Shaw launched a program called the ISC Safety Net described on the company's website as is an “initiative designed to help victims of domestic violence by providing Pro Bono security services to victims and shelters”. The following year Shaw became a board member of the Women's Advocates domestic violence shelter.

References

External links
 Icon Services Corporation
 Behind The Bodyguard Business
 4Seen Magazine Up Close with Mr. Shaw: The Iconic Man, By A. Priceless. March, 2011.
W Magazine The Users Guide to Tastefully Getting Around Town With Your Bodyguards, By Danielle Stein.  August, 2008.
 Washington Post Online article, By Kristin Edelhauser Chessman. February 25, 2008.
 Black Enterprise Article, March, 2008.
 CSOOnline article By Katherine Walsh, February 19, 2008.
 Portfolio Magazine By Susan Karlin, November 8, 2007.
 E! Television Special – Celebrity Assistants September 6, 2006

Living people
Bodyguards
Year of birth missing (living people)